Leonardo "Leo" Gabriel Tambussi (born September 2, 1981) is a retired football player from Mar del Plata in Buenos Aires Province, Argentina.

Club career
Born in Mar del Plata, Tambussi began playing senior football with Racing Club. By age 19, he was a promising prospect as a central defender for Racing, however on his agent's advice, he refused to sign a new contract with Racing during the Clausura Torneo of the 2000–01 Argentine Primera División and was separated from the squad. After making an appeal to free himself from his existing contract, he had to accept the AFA's decision in favor of Racing and continue at the club.

Tambussi has also played for Arsenal de Sarandí in Argentina, and Dorados and Club Tijuana in Mexico.

Tambussi played in the Primeira Liga with Boavista F.C., but after suffering a serious knee injury during the 2007–08 season, he left the club for Liga de Honra side Portimonense S.C. in July 2008.

References

External links
 Argentine Primera statistics
Guardian statistics
Profile at Soccerway

1981 births
Living people
Argentine footballers
Argentine expatriate footballers
Association football defenders
Racing Club de Avellaneda footballers
Arsenal de Sarandí footballers
Dorados de Sinaloa footballers
Sportivo Desamparados footballers
Club Tijuana footballers
Boavista F.C. players
Portimonense S.C. players
Club Atlético Alvarado players
Argentine Primera División players
Torneo Federal A players
Liga MX players
Primeira Liga players
Sportspeople from Mar del Plata
Argentine expatriate sportspeople in Mexico
Argentine expatriate sportspeople in Portugal
Expatriate footballers in Mexico
Expatriate footballers in Portugal